The 1994–95 Wills World Series (named after sponsor Wills of ITC Limited) was a One Day International (ODI) cricket tri-series where the India national cricket team played host to the West Indies national cricket team and New Zealand national cricket team. India and the West Indies reached the final at the Eden Gardens where close to 100,000 witnessed India beat the West Indies.

India lost only once, controversially to the West Indies in the last group game. Manoj Prabhakar and Nayan Mongia were accused of not making an effort to win the match after stonewalling the run-chase. The Indian authorities suspended Prabhakar and Mongia and the match referee Raman Subba Row docked the team two points for not playing in the spirit of the game. India protested the decision to the ICC, who ruled that the Row had exceeded his authority.

Subba Row also suspended the West Indies vice-captain Brian Lara for one game, for arguing with the umpire, who he thought should've consulted the third umpire before giving him out stumped.

New Zealand did not win any of their four games, though they were unlucky to see the match washed out after dismissing the West Indies cheaply in the opening game.

Venues

Squads

Points table

 Advanced to final

Pool matches

1st ODI

2nd ODI

3rd ODI

4th ODI

5th ODI

6th ODI

Final

7th ODI

References

External links
 Series home at ESPNcricinfo
 Series home at ESPNcricinfo archive

One Day International cricket competitions
International cricket competitions from 1994–95 to 1997
ITC Limited